Bright Days Ahead is a 2013 French romance film directed by Marion Vernoux. It was screened in the Gala Presentation section at the 2013 Toronto International Film Festival. In January 2014, Fanny Ardant received a nomination for Best Actress at the 39th César Awards. Based on a novel by Fanny Chesnel, it tells the story of a married woman who retires at age 60 and joins a computer class, where she starts an affair with the much younger instructor.

Plot
In a port on the north-west coast of France, Caroline retires from her husband's dental practice at age 60. Her married daughters give her a trial subscription to “Les Beaux Jours”, a club for retired people, where she joins the computer class. She and Julien, the instructor who is in his thirties, feel a mutual attraction and start an affair of snatched encounters. Her behaviour becomes increasingly reckless: wearing heavy make-up, taking up smoking, drinking lots of wine, endlessly receiving and sending texts, ignoring family friends, disappearing at odd hours, and coming home with clothes awry. Her husband warns her that he and others can't help noticing. Nevertheless, she books a short holiday in Iceland for her and Julien. At the airport, as Julien is chatting to a young Englishwoman on their flight, Caroline realises that she must release him to his sort of world and return to hers. She rings her husband to fetch her home.

Cast
 Fanny Ardant as Caroline 
 Laurent Lafitte as Julien 
 Patrick Chesnais as Philippe
 Jean-François Stévenin as Roger
 Fanny Cottençon as Chantal
 Marie Rivière as Jocelyne aka Jojo
 Marc Chapiteau as Hugues
 Féodor Atkine as Paul
 Olivia Côte as Lydia
 Catherine Lachens as Sylviane
 Alain Cauchi as Jacky
 Émilie Caen as The hostess

References

External links
 

2013 films
2013 romance films
French romance films
2010s French-language films
Films directed by Marion Vernoux
2010s French films